Portia James (March 11, 1953 - December 2, 2015) was an American curator and historian. A specialist in African-American material culture, she worked as the cultural resources manager of the Anacostia Community Museum.

Life 
James graduated from Wayne State University, and Howard University.

James' exhibition work included The Real McCoy: African American Invention and Innovation, 1619-1930 (1989); Black Mosaic: Community, Race and Ethnicity among Black Immigrants in Washington, DC (1994); Down Through the Years: Stories from the Anacostia Museum Collection (1996); East of the River: Continuity and Change (2007);  Jubilee: African American Celebration (2008); Exercise Your Mynd:  Bk Adams I AM ART (2012); Arture (2012); Ubuhle Women: Beadwork and the Art of Independence (2013); and Hand of Freedom: The Life and Legacy of the Plummer Family (2015). She researched the life of Leslie J. Payne.

Selected works
James, Portia. "Building a Community-Based Identity at Anacostia Museum." Curator: The Museum Journal. 39:1 (1996): 19-44.
James, Portia. The Real McCoy: African-American Invention and Innovations, 1619-1930. Washington: Smithsonian Institution (1990). 
James, Portia. Building Immigrant Community Life in Washington DC: A Public History Approach," Trotter Review,Vol. 10: Iss. 1, Article 4

References

American curators
American women curators
Smithsonian Institution people
Cultural academics
2015 deaths
1953 births
Wayne State University alumni
Howard University alumni
20th-century American women writers
21st-century American women